Joe Bedford (born 16 February 1984) is an English  professional rugby union player. His primary position is scrum half.
Bedford joined Newport Gwent Dragons for the 2011-12 season having previously played for Rotherham Titans and Leeds Carnegie. In January 2013 Bedford was released by Newport Gwent Dragons and joined Doncaster RFC.

References

External links
profile at Leeds Carnegie
Newport Gwent Dragons profile

Living people
1984 births
Rugby union players from Leeds
English rugby union players
Leeds Tykes players
Rotherham Titans players
Dragons RFC players
Rugby union scrum-halves